This is a complete list of members of the United States Senate during the 8th United States Congress listed by seniority, from March 4, 1803, to March 3, 1805.

The order of service is based on the commencement of the senator's first term, with senators entering service the same day ranked alphabetically.

The two main parties in the 8th Congress were the Federalists (F), and Democratic Republicans (DR).

Terms of service

U.S. Senate seniority list

See also
8th United States Congress
List of members of the United States House of Representatives in the 8th Congress by seniority

Notes

External links
Senate Seniority List

008